The 2015–16 Liga IV was the 74th season of the Liga IV, the fourth tier of the Romanian football league system. The champions of each county association play against one from a neighboring county in a playoff to gain promotion.

Promotion play-off 

The matches are scheduled to be played on 18 and 25 June 2016.

|-
||2–2||4–1
||4–3||0–3
||2–0||4–1
||2–2||0–3
||1–3||0–2
||4–2||0–1
||1–4||1–3
||2–1||1–0
||0–1||5–1
||0–0||1–1
||1–0||7–0
||w/o||w/o
||1–0||3–0
||1–0||2–2 
||4–0||3–0
||1–6||0–3 (forfait)
||4–1||1–3
||1–0||5–1
||1–1||1–4
||3–1||0–2
||3–1||1–1
|}

County leagues

Alba County

Arad County

Argeș County

Championship play-off  
</onlyinclude>

Relegation play-out

Bacău County

Bihor County

Bistrița-Năsăud County

Botoșani County

Relegation play-off  
The 13th and 14th-placed teams of the Liga IV faces the 2nd placed teams from the two series of Liga V Botoșani.

Brașov County

Brăila County

Championship play-off  
The teams started the play-off with only the points achieved in the regular season against the other qualified teams.

Championship play-out  
The teams started the play-out with only the points achieved in the regular season against the other qualified teams.

Bucharest

Buzău County

Relegation play-off  
The 14th and 15th-placed teams of Liga IV Buzău faces the 2nd-placed teams in the two series of Liga V Buzău.

||0–3||2–6
||4–4||1–3

Caraș-Severin County

Călărași County

Cluj County

Constanța County

Covasna County

Dâmbovița County

Dolj County

Regular season

Championship play-off  
Teams started the play-off with their points from the Regular season halved, rounded upwards, and no other records carried over from the Regular season.

Championship play-out  
Teams started the play-out with their points from the Regular season halved, rounded upwards, and no other records carried over from the Regular season.

Galați County

Giurgiu County

South Series

North Series

Championship play-off  
The championship play-off played between the best two ranked teams in each series of the regular season. All matches were played at Comunal Stadium in Bolintin-Deal on 7 and 8 June 2016 the semi-finals and on 11 June 2016 the final.

Semi-finals

Final 

Arsenal Malu won the 2015–16 Liga IV Giurgiu County and qualify to promotion play-off in Liga III.

Gorj County

Harghita County

Hunedoara County

Ialomița County

Iași County

Ilfov County

Seria 1

Seria 2

Championship play-off  
The Championship play-off will be played between the first two teams from each series of the regular season.

All matches were played at Voința Stadium from Ghermănești.

Semi-finals

Final 

Voința Crevedia won the 2015–16 Liga IV Ilfov County and qualify to promotion play-off in Liga III.

Maramureș County

North Series

South Series

Championship final  
The championship final was played on 11 June 2016 at Viorel Mateianu Stadium in Baia Mare.

Viitorul Ulmeni won the 2015–16 Liga IV Maramureș County and qualify to promotion play-off in Liga III.

Mehedinți County

Mureș County

Neamț County

Championship play-off  
Championship play-off played in a single round-robin tournament between the best four teams of the regular season. The teams started the play-off with the following points: 1st place – 3 points, 2nd place – 2 points, 3rd place – 1 point, 4th place – 0 points.

All matches were played at Cimentul Stadium from Bicaz.

Olt County

Prahova County

Satu Mare County

Sălaj County

Sibiu County

Suceava County

Teleorman County

Timiș County

Tulcea County

Championship play-off

Semi-finals 

|}

Final 

Șoimii Topolog won the 2015–16 Liga IV Tulcea County and qualify to promotion play-off in Liga III.

Vaslui County

Championship play-off

Vâlcea County

Vrancea County

Seria 1

Seria 2

Seria 3

Championship play-off

Group A

Group B

Semi-finals

Final 

Euromania Dumbrăveni won the 2015–16 Liga IV Vrancea County and qualify to promotion play-off in Liga III.

See also

 2015–16 Liga I
 2015–16 Liga II
 2015–16 Liga III

References

External links
 FRF

Liga IV seasons
4
Romania